Iris Mary Birtwistle (29 May 1918 – 22 June 2006; also known as Lilla and IM Birtwistle) was an English lyric poet and gallery owner who nurtured young artists despite eventually losing her sight.

Life & career 
Born near Blackburn, Lancashire on 29 May 1918, the second of eight children of a cotton-mill owner, James Astley Birtwistle and his wife Muriel Mary (née Marwood).
 Her brother, Col. Michael Albert Astley Birtwistle, was a High Sheriff of Lancashire. Her younger sister is the poet and non-fiction writer Angela Kirby. She was a cousin of race horse trainer Monica Dickinson (née Birtwistle, the mother of Michael Dickinson). She was educated at the Convent of the Holy Child Jesus, Mayfield, Sussex and at the Reimann School of Art in London. During the Second World War, she enlisted as an officer in the Wrens.
 
Throughout her life she wrote poetry, which in the 1940s, 1950s and 1960s appeared in many of the major journals and other well known publications, including: Poetry Review, The New English Weekly, The Fortnightly, The Spectator, The Tablet, and The Times Literary Supplement. She was admired by leading writers of her day such as T. S. Eliot, Robert Graves, and Dame Muriel Spark (who credited Birtwistle with her conversion to Catholicism).
 
In the 1950s she adopted three sons and settled in Walberswick, Suffolk, where she opened the first of her unique art galleries. Jennifer Lash lived with her there for a period of time, and was introduced to her future husband, Mark Fiennes, by Birtwistle. There, Birwistle championed the Royal Academicians Mary Potter, Mary Newcomb, Jeffrey Camp and Philip Sutton. She nurtured young talent, and sold early work of a young David Hockney. In the late 1960s and early 1970s she had a small gallery in Aldeburgh.

Although she continued to write poetry all her life, from the 1960s onwards being increasingly absorbed by her family and her galleries she wrote less and less. Her last poem was written in 1999 to celebrate the marriage of singer Nick Cave to model Susie Bick.

In the 1970s she moved to Burnham Deepdale, Norfolk where she opened the last of her successful, if eccentric, galleries, Deepdale Exhibitions. This she ran until her death despite increasing loss of sight from hereditary glaucoma, which rendered her blind for the last 15 years of her life.
 
Although a collection of her work had been completed before her death, When Leaf and Note are Gone was finally published posthumously by Buff Press in 2008, edited by poets Anne Stewart and Angela Kirby (Birtwistle’s youngest sister). The introduction was by  writer and poet Derek Stanford.
 
Birtwistle remained a devout Roman Catholic all her life. and died on 20 June 2006, aged 86.

Footnotes

References 
 Muriel Spark, The Biography, Martin Stannard, W.W. Norton & Co, (2009) 
 Curriculum Vitae: A Volume of Autobiography, Muriel Spark. Constable (1992) p. 192 
 Penelope Fitzgerald: A Life, Hermione Lee, Random House (2014) 
 Catholicism - An Introduction: Teach Yourself, Peter Stanford, Hachette UK (2010) 
 Time and Concord: Aldeburgh Festival Recollections, Wake-Walker, Jenni, Autograph (1997) p. 122-123 
 The Reimann School: A Design Diaspora, Yasuku Suga, Artmonsky Arts (2014) p. 50 
 Why I Am Still a Catholic: Essays in Faith and Perseverance, Peter Stanford, Continuum International Publishing Group Ltd (2005) 
 Inside the Forties: Literary Memoirs, 1937-57, Derek Stanford, Sidgwick & Jackson Ltd (1977) p. 188

External links 

 Lundy, Darryl. Iris Mary Birtwistle in The Peerage
 Copsey, Tony. Iris Mary Birtwistle in Suffolk Painters

1918 births
2006 deaths
People from Blackburn with Darwen
People from Walberswick
People from Brancaster
English Roman Catholics
20th-century English poets
English blind people
Writers from Lancashire